

The Savoia-Pomilio SP.2 was a reconnaissance and bomber aircraft built in Italy during the First World War. It was a refined version of the SP.1, and like it, took its basic configuration from the Farman MF.11: a biplane with twin tails and a fuselage nacelle that accommodated the crew and a pusher-mounted engine. The SP.2 entered mass production with SIA, and with co-designer Ottorino Pomilio's own firm that he had recently established.

Around 300 examples were produced, and by spring 1917, these equipped twelve front-line squadrons of the Aeronautica Militare. Of these machines, about a dozen participated in trials of the Revelli-FIAT 25 mm cannon before production of this weapon was discontinued.

Operators

Corpo Aeronautico Militare

Specifications

Notes

References
 
 
 

Savoia-Pomilio aircraft
1910s Italian military reconnaissance aircraft
1910s Italian bomber aircraft
Biplanes
Aircraft first flown in 1916